Robert Forbes McNaughton, Jr. (1924–2014) was an American mathematician, logician, and computer scientist with several key contributions in formal languages, grammars and rewriting systems, and word combinatorics.

McNaughton was originally from Brooklyn, and earned a bachelor's degree from Columbia University.
He completed his Ph.D. at Harvard University; his dissertation, On Establishing the Consistency of Systems, was supervised by Willard Van Orman Quine.
He taught at the University of Pennsylvania and then at the Rensselaer Polytechnic Institute.

He died in 2014 in Troy, New York.

References

1924 births
2014 deaths
20th-century American mathematicians
21st-century American mathematicians
American computer scientists
Theoretical computer scientists
Columbia University alumni
Harvard University alumni
University of Pennsylvania faculty
Rensselaer Polytechnic Institute faculty